Shane Anthony Tudor (born 10 February 1982) is an English former footballer. He played as a midfielder, primarily in the right wing position. He scored 31 goals in 234 appearances throughout a ten-year career in the Football League.

He began his career at Wolverhampton Wanderers, before moving to Cambridge United in November 2001. He played for the club in the Football League Trophy final in 2002, but severe financial difficulties caused the club to drop from the Second Division into the Conference National. He signed with Leyton Orient in May 2005, and helped the club win promotion out of League Two in 2005–06. Moving on to Port Vale in May 2007, injuries began to disrupt his career, leaving him unable to play for Shrewsbury Town despite him joining the club on loan. He retired from football in January 2009 aged just 26, after a knee injury ended his professional career.

Career
Tudor began his career at hometown club Wolverhampton Wanderers, coming through the youth ranks before signing professional forms for the 1999–2000 season. He made his First Division debut on 23 December 2000, replacing Darren Bazeley 82 minutes into a 1–0 win over Sheffield Wednesday at Hillsborough. However he did not feature in new manager Dave Jones's first team plans, and so was allowed to join John Taylor's Cambridge United on a free transfer in November 2001.

He scored his first senior goal at the Abbey Stadium in the FA Cup on 17 November 2001, in a 1–1 draw with Notts County. He scored four goals in 36 appearances in the 2001–02 season, however Cambridge were relegated after finishing bottom of the Second Division; they failed to record an away win all season. Despite this record they managed to reach the final of the Football League Trophy at the Millennium Stadium, where they lost 4–1 to Blackpool; Tudor started the final, but was replaced by Danny Jackman after 60 minutes.

In November 2002 he signed a contract with the club which kept him with Cambridge until the summer of 2005. He scored ten goals in 34 games in 2002–03, as Cambridge posted a 12th-place finish in the Third Division. He played 40 games in 2003–04, scoring three goals, as United dropped a place to 13th. Tudor scored seven goals in 28 games in 2004–05 to become the club's joint top-scorer (with Jermaine Easter). It was a disappointing end to his Cambridge career though, as the club entered administration and were relegated into the Conference National after finishing bottom of the Football League.

Tudor was unwilling to play non-league football and started looking for another club. He quickly signed for Leyton Orient on a two-year deal. Despite undergoing groin surgery in December, and also suffering ankle problems towards the end of the season, he scored five goals in 29 games from his right-wing position to help the club to promotion from League Two. His ankle injury later needed surgery, though the operation was a success and saw him enjoy a return to form. His second season in the capital saw Orient retain their League One status with Tudor the main fixture on the right-wing, playing 36 times and scoring twice. At the end of the 2006–07 campaign he was released, after he informed "O's" boss Martin Ling that he would not be signing a new contract as he wanted to move back to his Midlands roots.

In May 2007, he signed for fellow League One side Port Vale on a two-year contract. He struggled to maintain his place in the side, only making 14 league appearances in his first season, as well as being sent out on loan to Shrewsbury Town, where he failed to make any appearances at all due to a hamstring injury. This was a disappointment for Tudor as he had hoped to make the move permanent, and he told the Shropshire Star "I'll be back". He caused controversy on 20 September 2008, when after a 4–1 defeat to Macclesfield Town at Vale Park he was quoting as saying "No disrespect to them [Macclesfield], but they're a shit club. Look at the size of us to them and it's a million miles away." He later apologised to the club, saying that he had been "disappointed and angry" to have been limited to a late cameo appearance in the game, though stood by his belief that Port Vale were a bigger club than Macclesfield. It was against Shrewsbury Town at the New Meadow on 11 October 2008, where Tudor sustained a knee injury. He underwent surgery which proved unsuccessful, and he retired from professional football in January 2009, aged just 26. He stated his ambition to go into management and said "It would be nice to come back and manage Port Vale one day."

Post-retirement
After being forced to retire from football he graduated with a degree in sports journalist from Staffordshire University in 2011, and two years later founded the Sporting Stars Academy in Stoke-on-Trent with former teammate Robin Hulbert.

Career statistics

Honours
Cambridge United
Football League Trophy runner up: 2002

Leyton Orient
League Two third-place promotion: 2005–06

References

1982 births
Living people
Footballers from Wolverhampton
English footballers
Association football wingers
Wolverhampton Wanderers F.C. players
Cambridge United F.C. players
Leyton Orient F.C. players
Port Vale F.C. players
Shrewsbury Town F.C. players
English Football League players
Alumni of Staffordshire University